Bezirk Perg is a district of the state of 
Upper Austria in Austria.

Municipalities
Towns (Städte) are indicated in boldface; market towns (Marktgemeinden) in italics; suburbs, hamlets and other subdivisions of a municipality are indicated in small characters.
 Allerheiligen im Mühlkreis
 Arbing
 Bad Kreuzen
 Baumgartenberg
 Dimbach
 Grein
 Katsdorf
 Klam
 Langenstein
 Luftenberg an der Donau
 Mauthausen
 Mitterkirchen im Machland
 Münzbach
 Naarn im Machlande
 Pabneukirchen
 Perg
 Rechberg
 Ried in der Riedmark
 Sankt Georgen am Walde
 Sankt Georgen an der Gusen
 Sankt Nikola an der Donau
 Sankt Thomas am Blasenstein
 Saxen
 Schwertberg
 Waldhausen im Strudengau
 Windhaag bei Perg

 
Districts of Upper Austria